This article lists results for French association football team Montpellier HSC in European competition.

Participations
As of 4 December 2012, Montpellier have competed in:
1 participation in the European Cup / UEFA Champions League
1 participation in the UEFA Cup Winners' Cup
4 participations in the UEFA Cup / UEFA Europa League
2 participations in the UEFA Intertoto Cup / UEFA Intertoto Cup

Record by competition
As of 4 December 2012

Matches in Europe

References

 UEFA European Cup Matches – Montpellier

Europe
Montpellier